
This is a list of bridges documented by the Historic American Engineering Record in the US state of Florida.

Bridges

References

List
List
Florida
Bridges, HAER
Bridges, HAER